Alex Anthony Sanchez (born April 8, 1966) is an American former Major League Baseball (MLB) pitcher who played for the Toronto Blue Jays in 1989.

Early life
Sanchez was born in Concord, California and attended Antioch High School. In high school, he was named A-East Bay and All-Northern California for two years. USA Today named Sanchez one of the top 25 pro prospects, and he was drafted by the Chicago Cubs out of high school. Sanchez elected to attend the University of California, Los Angeles (UCLA) instead.

College career
At UCLA, he set a single season all-time record for having 16 wins in one season in 1986. He was named co-Player of the Year in the Pac 10, and first team All-America by Baseball America in 1986. After the 1986 season, he played collegiate summer baseball with the Harwich Mariners of the Cape Cod Baseball League and was named a league all-star.

Professional career
Sanchez was drafted by the Toronto Blue Jays in the 1st round (17th pick overall) of the 1987 Major League Baseball Draft. He was named International League Most Valuable Pitcher in 1989 while playing for the Syracuse Chiefs. He played for the Blue Jays for the 1989 season. On September 24, 1990, Sanchez was traded to the Cleveland Indians. He was traded back to the Blue Jays on November 6, 1990.

Sanchez signed with the Kansas City Royals in 1992 and played with their minor league affiliates until 1993. In 1994 and 1995, he played with the minor league affiliates of the San Diego Padres, Seattle Mariners and the Oakland Athletics.

Awards and honors
He was inducted into the Antioch Sports Hall of Fame in 2010.

Personal
Sanchez was high school teammates with Chicago Cubs pitcher Jeff Pico and PGA Tour golfer Larry Silveira.

References

External links

	

1966 births
Living people
All-American college baseball players
American expatriate baseball players in Canada
Baseball City Royals players
Baseball players from California
Calgary Cannons players
Edmonton Trappers players
Greenville Bluesmen players
Harwich Mariners players
Knoxville Blue Jays players
Major League Baseball pitchers
Memphis Chicks players
Myrtle Beach Blue Jays players
Omaha Royals players
Pacific Suns players
People from Antioch, California
St. Catharines Blue Jays players
Syracuse Chiefs players
Toronto Blue Jays players
UCLA Bruins baseball players
Wichita Wranglers players